Yves Diba Ilunga (born 12 August 1987) is a football player who plays for AS Vita Club and the DR Congo national football team.

International career

International goals
Scores and results list DR Congo's goal tally first.

References

1987 births
Living people
People from Lubumbashi
Democratic Republic of the Congo footballers
Democratic Republic of the Congo expatriate footballers
Democratic Republic of the Congo international footballers
Association football forwards
Expatriate footballers in Saudi Arabia
Najran SC players
Al-Raed FC players
Al-Sailiya SC players
Al Kharaitiyat SC players
Ajman Club players
Al-Shoulla FC players
2013 Africa Cup of Nations players
Saudi First Division League players
UAE First Division League players
Saudi Professional League players
Qatar Stars League players